Christians, most of whom are ethnic Russians, constitute less than 9% of the population in Turkmenistan. Eastern Orthodoxy in Turkmenistan is the main form of Christianity.

Russian Orthodox Church 
The Russian Orthodox Church is officially recognized and constitute the largest religious minority. The Church is under the jurisdiction of the Russian Orthodox Archbishop in Tashkent, Uzbekistan.

Other denominations 
Around 200 Catholics live in Turkmenistan. There are also ethnic Germans, who are practising Lutherans; while there are few Evangelical Christians in Turkmenistan. Evangelical Christian Baptist Church of Turkmenistan, Seventh-day Adventist Church of Turkmenistan, Full Gospel Christian Church of Turkmenistan (Pentecostals), Light of the East Church (Dashoguz Pentecostal Church), Greater Grace Church of Turkmenistan, International Church of Christ, and the New Apostolic Church of Turkmenistan are all registered Christian denominations.

Since 2003 all religious groups have to register and unregistered activity is illegal.

See also 
Religion in Turkmenistan
Protestantism in Turkmenistan
Roman Catholicism in Turkmenistan

References